The following highways are numbered 900:

United States